The Hakai Institute (formerly the Hakai Beach Institute) is a scientific research, teaching and meeting center established by Eric Peterson and Christina Munck on Calvert Island, a remote island on the exposed Pacific edge of the Great Bear Rainforest on the Central Coast of British Columbia, Canada. The Hakai Institute is a program of the Tula Foundation, a British Columbia-based private foundation also founded by Peterson and Munck. The Hakai Institute specializes in "long-term ecological research". It has active research programs in archaeology, earth sciences, terrestrial ecology and marine ecology. The Hakai Institute enjoys partnerships with neighbouring First Nations, local schools, government agencies and the BC universities. In 2015, the Hakai Institute launched Hakai Magazine.

History
Hakai Institute was founded in 2002 by the Tula Foundation with the goal of purchasing and preserving land along the Central Coast. Over time, the focus shifted to scientific research. In 2008, the institute partnered with British Columbia universities and the Wuikinuxv First Nation to conduct a comprehensive ecological study of Rivers Inlet.

In 2009, the institute purchased the former Hakai Beach Resort on Calvert Island. The fishing lodge was converted to an ecological observatory and opened the following spring to host the 2010 Coastal Guardian Watchmen conference. In 2014, the institute established a second ecological observatory on Quadra Island near the town of Campbell River. The institute has since partnered with numerous universities and government institutions in researching the ecology of the wider British Columbia Coast.

References

External links
 Tula Foundation

Research institutes in Canada
2002 establishments in British Columbia
Educational organizations based in British Columbia